Bilateral ties between Malaysia and the United States were established upon Malayan independence in 1957.  The US was, and still is one of the largest trading partners for Malaysia and is traditionally considered to be Malaysia's oldest and closest ally in military, economic and education sectors. Malaya was the predecessor state to Malaysia, a larger federation which was formed through the merger of Malaya, North Borneo, Sarawak and Singapore in 1963. Immediately before the merger, the latter three territories were previously part of the British Empire. But the US had consular and commercial presence in Malaya since the 1800s. US merchants, especially Joseph William Torrey together with Thomas Bradley Harris also had commercial interests in north western coast of Borneo in the 19th century as well, where they established the American Trading Company of Borneo.

Malaysia has its embassy in Washington, D.C., and consulate-general offices in Los Angeles and New York City. The United States maintains its embassy in Kuala Lumpur. Beginning from 2014, the US considered Malaysia as a Comprehensive Partner which increased the importance of the diplomatic ties as part of President Barack Obama's Pivot to Asia policy. The partnership increased bilateral consultations and co-operation on politics, diplomacy, trade, investment, education, people-to-people ties, security, the environment, science, technology and energy, which continued to be enhanced by President Donald Trump in 2017.

In 2016, the US is Malaysia's third largest export market in terms of value, while Malaysia is the US's 25th largest export destination and among the largest trading partners for the latter.

History 

The United States has a long commercial interest in Malaysia, dating back since the 1800s when the territories now part of the Southeast Asian country were part of the British Empire. While Malaysia through Malaya only established a diplomatic presence in the US beginning from 1957, the US had consular posts in Malaya and commercial interests in northern Borneo since the 1800s. In 1850, the US recognised the status of Kingdom of Sarawak which was established by an Englishman named James Brooke as an independent state. US merchants Torrey and Harris through the American Trading Company of Borneo had a tract of land in north western of Borneo, which was however sold to Baron von Overbeck in 1876. The US further appointed a consul in George Town in 1918 and established additional consular posts in Kuala Lumpur in 1948 and Kuching in 1968. The modern ties between Malaysia and the US are generally warm with the US had supported Malaysia during the Indonesia–Malaysia confrontation, an armed conflict arising from Indonesian opposition to the formation of Malaysia, marking the beginning of US direct involvement in the political affairs of Malaysia. Earlier during the World War II, the US played a role in the liberation of Southeast Asia from Japanese occupation especially in the liberation of Borneo as the island is located close to the Commonwealth of the Philippines, which is a protectorate of the latter.

Political relations, however became strained, under the Bush administration during the Iraq War. Mahathir Mohamad who ruled from 1981 until 2003 was critical of the foreign policy of the United States at the time, especially the foreign policy of the George W. Bush administration's invasion of Iraq during the Iraq War. Nevertheless, these periods of tensions between the two nations did not prevent the US from being one of the largest trading partners for Malaysia during Mahathir's tenure. The US was, and still is one of the largest trading partners for Malaysia and is traditionally considered to be Malaysia's closest ally. In 2002, Malaysia-US Friendship Council was established to strengthen the friendship between the Malaysian government and the US government. Mohd Noor Amin, Chairman of the International Multilateral Partnership Against Cyber Threats (IMPACT), was appointed as the Secretary-General for this council. The council is headquartered in Washington, D.C. and sponsored by leading Malaysian companies to offer advice on matters relating to bilateral relationship between the two countries.

Under the helm of Prime Minister Najib Razak's administration, the two-way diplomatic ties between the two sovereign nations have since warmed and became normalized once more. Subsequently, US President Barack Obama's made his first official visit to Malaysia in April 2014, the first visit by a sitting US President since 1966. Prime Minister Najib and President Obama issued a joint statement that, among other things, elevated the Malaysia-US relationship to a comprehensive partnership. Malaysia is currently pursuing the Trans-Pacific Partnership (TPP) treaty with the support of the US until January 2017. Both countries continue to enjoy warm relations with the two leaders became close personal friends. On Christmas Eve in 2014, both Najib and Obama are seen playing golf together in Hawaii. Following the victory of Donald Trump in the 2016 US presidential election, the relations continue to be strengthened with Najib was among the international leaders that congratulated Trump and looked forward to continuing a partnership with the US under his presidency. In June 2018, the United States Embassy in Kuala Lumpur hosting a series of programs in Sabah (the former North Borneo) to celebrate the 150+ years of partnership with the people of the territory.

On 13 June 2020, former Prime Minister Mahathir Mohamad endorsed former Vice President Joe Biden in the 2020 US Presidential Election.

Economic trade and relations 

The earliest significant economic relations between the territories now part of Malaysia, in particular Malaya, was the US involvement in the production and trade of tin and rubber. Malaya at one time was the largest single producer of both commodities and the US was the largest importer of Malayan tin. By 1917, rubber became Malaya's most important exports and the US absorbed 77% of Malaya's total rubber production. The great demand for rubber was due to the rising production of automobile in Malaysia.

In the modern days, the US is one of the largest foreign investor in Malaysia. The American Malaysian Chamber of Commerce serves as a business association for collaboration between both countries. While figures capturing the full range of foreign investment (including oil and gas) are not available, American companies are particularly active in the energy, electronics, and manufacturing sectors and employ nearly 200,000 Malaysian workers. The cumulative value of US private investment in the manufacturing sector in Malaysia is roughly $15 billion. In the 1970s, American companies, including Agilent AMD, Fairchild Semiconductor, Freescale Semiconductor, Intel, Texas Instruments and Western Digital pioneered the Malaysian electrical and electronics (E&E) sector, which exports billions of dollars of equipment to global supply chains every year. Major US oil and gas companies, including ExxonMobil, ConocoPhillips, Hess and Murphy Oil, have invested billions of dollars to develop Malaysia's energy resources. Many US-based fast-food/coffeehouse chains such as A&W Restaurants, Burger King, Domino's Pizza, Dunkin' Donuts, KFC, McDonald's, Pizza Hut, Starbucks, Subway, Texas Chicken and Wendy's had already dominating the Malaysian fast food/coffeehouse markets. Recent US investors include Hershey, Kellogg's, Bose and Golden Gate Capital. The US is Malaysia's fourth largest trading partner and Malaysia is the 22nd largest trading partner of the US Annual two-way trade in goods and services in 2013  amounted to approximately $44 billion.

Malaysia and the US launched negotiations for a bilateral free trade agreement in June 2005 but did not conclude an agreement after eight rounds of talks. Malaysian investment in the US is small but growing, particularly in leisure, gaming and biotechnology. Significant Malaysian companies operating in the US include Genting's Resort World Casino and MOL Global, a New York Stock Exchange listed company. In 2010, Malaysia joined the US, Australia, Brunei, Canada, Chile, Mexico, New Zealand, Peru, Singapore and Vietnam in negotiating the Trans-Pacific Partnership (TPP) (Japan subsequently joined the negotiations in 2013). This agreement seeks to expand market access, strengthen intellectual property protections, and support high labour and environmental standards while fostering greater economic integration among participants. The US however has since left the TPP in 2017.

Education relations 

The Fulbright English Teaching Assistant program helping improve the English language skills of thousands of Malaysian secondary school students and there is around 6,000 alumni of United States Department of State-sponsored exchange programs in Malaysia. In 2014, President Obama announced additional exchange programs, grant opportunities and fellowships for youth ages 18–35 under the Young Southeast Asian Young Leaders Initiative (YSEALI). Since 2001, the Ambassadors Fund for Cultural Preservation (AFCP) has supported 10 projects to support the preservation of cultural heritage in Malaysia.

Security co-operation and relations 

Malaysia and the US enjoy strong security co-operation, with both have maintained steady defence co-operation and alliance since the 1990s. While Malaysia's security are secured by the Five Power Defence Arrangements (FPDA) with Australia, New Zealand, Singapore and the United Kingdom, the US also has military alliance with both Australia and New Zealand under the Australia, New Zealand, United States Security Treaty (ANZUS) and has established direct military and political co-operation with Singapore and Malaysia, whose armed forces were growing increasingly dependent on American arms shipments, with the M4 carbine and M16 rifle became the major assault rifles for both armed forces. Several US high-technology weapons systems also been purchased by Malaysia, notably the McDonnell Douglas F/A-18D fighter aircraft, and McDonnell Douglas MD 530G attack helicopter.

During the Battle of Mogadishu in October 1993, 113 members of a Malaysian Army battalion was deployed as part of the United Nations Operation in Somalia II to rescue American rangers who were surrounded by Somali militants after two US Sikorsky UH-60 Black Hawk was shot down by the latter. Earlier on 1 July 2003, Malaysia established a Southeast Asia Regional Centre for Counter-Terrorism (SEARCCT), where the two collaborating in combating terrorist financing. Both Malaysia and the US share a strong military-to-military relationship with numerous exchanges, training, joint exercises, and visits such as the annual participation of both countries in the Cooperation Afloat Readiness and Training (Exercise CARAT) and co-operation in International Military Education and Training (IMET). The US is also among the foreign countries that has collaborated with the centre in conducting capacity building programmes. Malaysia's Peacekeeping Centre provides pre-deployment training to Malaysian and other peacekeepers before deployment on United Nations (UN) missions. Through the Global Peace Operations Initiative, the US provided support for the Malaysian Peacekeeping Centre. During President Obama's April 2014 visit, Malaysia endorsed the Proliferation Security Initiative (PSI).

Official visits 
Prime Minister Najib Razak and President Barack Obama met just before the Nuclear Security Summit in Washington on 12 April 2010. This meeting was thought by many to represent a significant improvement in Malaysia–United States relations. This was their first one-on-one meeting. During their talk, Obama sought further assistance from Malaysia in stemming nuclear proliferation which Obama described as the greatest threat to world security. In June 2009 Najib and Obama discussed via telephone the global financial crisis, nuclear non-proliferation issues and two Malaysians detained at Guantanamo Bay detention camp. During the summit Najib stressed that Malaysia only supported nuclear programmes designed for peaceful purposes. Najib's attendance at the summit was part of a week-long official visit to the US.

On 21 October 2013, Secretary of State John Kerry and Secretary of Commerce Penny Pritzker visited Kuala Lumpur to participate in the Global Entrepreneurship Summit. Secretary Kerry visited Malaysia again from 4 to 6 August 2015 to attend the ASEAN Regional Forum (ARF). On 26 April 2014, President Obama made a state visit to Malaysia. He is the second US President to visit Malaysia since Lyndon B. Johnson in 1966.

The following are senior US diplomats and politicians who have visited Malaysia:
 US Secretary of State Condoleezza Rice visited Kuala Lumpur in July 2006.
 US Secretary of State Hillary Clinton made a 3-day bilateral visit to Kuala Lumpur in November 2010.
 US Secretary of Defense Robert Gates visited Malaysia in November 2010.
 US Attorney General Eric Holder visited Kuala Lumpur, Malaysia in July 2012.
 US Secretary of Defense Chuck Hagel visited Kuala Lumpur, Malaysia in August 2013.
 US Secretary of the Treasury Jacob Lew visited Kuala Lumpur, Malaysia in November 2013.
 US Trade Representative Michael Froman visited Kuala Lumpur, Malaysia on four occasions, most recently in 2015.
 US Congress bipartisan delegation led by Paul Ryan, Chairman of the House Ways and Means Committee visited Kuala Lumpur, Malaysia in February 2015.
 US Secretary of State Mike Pompeo visited Kuala Lumpur, Malaysia in August 2018.

Public opinion 
According to global opinion polls, only 27% of Malaysians viewed the US favourably in 2007, likely due to disapproval of US foreign policy against fellow Islamic nations. However, as of 2013, 55% of Malaysians view the US favourably, declining somewhat down to 51% in 2014. According to the same poll conducted in 2015, 54% of Malaysians had confidence that President Obama would do the right thing in international affairs. According to the 2012 US Global Leadership Report, 34% of Malaysians approved of US leadership, with 31% disapproving and 35% uncertain.

Diplomatic missions

American embassy to Malaysia 
The American embassy in Malaysia is located in Jalan Tun Razak, Kuala Lumpur. The Principal US Embassy Officials include:
 Ambassador – Brian D. McFeeters

Malaysian embassy to the United States 
 Ambassador – Azmil Mohd. Zabidi

See also 
 Asian Americans
 Malaysian Americans

References

Further reading 
 Gould, James W.  The United States and Malaysia (Cambridge UP, 1969)
 Heil, Karl. "Malaysian Americans." Gale Encyclopedia of Multicultural America, edited by Thomas Riggs, (3rd ed., vol. 3, Gale, 2014), pp. 155–162. online
 Lim, Shirley Geoklin. Among the White Moon Faces: An Asian American Memoir of Homelands (Feminist Press, 1996). excerpt
 Sodhy, Pamela. "Malaysian–American Relations during Indonesia's Confrontation against Malaysia, 1963–66." Journal of Southeast Asian Studies 19.1 (1988): 111-136. online

External links 

 Malaysia Embassy in Washington, D.C., United States
 United States Embassy in Kuala Lumpur, Malaysia
 A Guide to the United States’ History of Recognition, Diplomatic, and Consular Relations, by Country, since 1776: Malaysia United States Department of State
 
 
 Trade in Goods with Malaysia United States Census Bureau

 
United States
Malaysia